Acraea manca is a butterfly in the family Nymphalidae. It is found in Tanzania.

Description
Very similar to Acraea acrita qv.

Taxonomy
Acraea manca is a member of the Acraea acrita species group. The clade members are:

Acraea manca
Acraea acrita
Acraea chaeribula
Acraea eltringhamiana
Acraea guluensis
Acraea lualabae
Acraea pudorina 
Acraea utengulensis

Classification of Acraea by Henning, Henning & Williams, Pierre. J. & Bernaud

Acraea (group acrita) Henning, 1993 
Acraea (Rubraea) Henning & Williams, 2010 
Acraea (Acraea) (subgroup acrita) Pierre & Bernaud, 2013 
Acraea (Acraea)  Groupe egina Pierre & Bernaud, 2014

References

External links

Images representing  Acraea manca at Bold.

Butterflies described in 1904
manca
Endemic fauna of Tanzania
Butterflies of Africa